Mbalenhle Cleopatra Frazer, commonly known as Mbali Frazer, is a South African politician and former educator who has been KwaZulu-Natal's Member of the Executive Council (MEC) for Education since August 2022. She has served in the KwaZulu-Natal Legislature as an African National Congress MPL since 2014.

Career
Frazer is a former teacher and trade unionist. In 2014, Frazer was elected to the KwaZulu-Natal Legislature on the ticket of the African National Congress. She is a senior member of the provincial African National Congress Women's League in KwaZulu-Natal. Frazer supported Nkosazana Dlamini-Zuma's unsuccessful ANC presidential campaign in 2017. She was re-elected to the provincial legislature in 2019 and then elected as the chairperson of the public works committee. When Dlamini-Zuma came under scrutiny during the COVID-19 lockdown in 2020, Frazer came to her defence.

Provincial government
Following the resignation of Sihle Zikalala as the premier of KwaZulu-Natal on 5 August 2022, Frazer, ANC MPL Amanda Mapena and Finance MEC Nomusa Dube-Ncube were shortlisted by the provincial ANC as possible candidates to succeed Zikalala. The premier's position ultimately went to Dube-Ncube. Following Dube-Ncube's election and inauguration, she named her executive council on 11 August 2022. Frazer was appointed as the MEC for Education, succeeding Kwazi Mshengu. Trade unions welcomed her appointment.

References

External links

Living people
Zulu people
Year of birth missing (living people)
People from KwaZulu-Natal
African National Congress politicians
Members of the KwaZulu-Natal Legislature